Lenora Claire is an American television and media personality, casting director, writer, art curator and victim's rights advocate. She was named one of the LA Weekly 2011 "People of the Year" and "the Erin Brockovich of stalking" by Vice.

Career
Claire is a frequent guest on shows such as The Dr. Oz Show, 48 Hours, Crime Watch Daily and various podcasts sharing both her story as an empowered victim and also to advocate for other stalking victims and discuss proposed legislation. Claire began working on improved legislation for stalking victims and other associated crimes with Congressman Adam Schiff in 2016 and is currently working on a bill called S.A.V.E. (Stalking Abuse Victims Empowerment).

Claire is a founding member of the Los Angeles District Attorney’s Crime Victims Advisory Board where she was chosen to advise and advocate on behalf of survivors of gender-based violence.

In 2021, Claire founded Lenora Claire Consulting to provide on-set liaison services between survivors/victims and the productions telling their stories. The company—whose team includes Amanda Knox, survivor Kimberly Corban, forensic psychologist Dr. Kris Mohandie, and Dirty John survivor Terra Newell—specializes in creating a safe space for vulnerable individuals working with media professionals.

Claire has also written pieces for LA Weekly and contributed to panels on surviving sexual abuse.

Victim turned advocate

Shortly after being featured as one of the LA Weekly 2011 "People of the Year," Lenora caught the attention of a man named Justin Massler (aka Cloud Starchaser) who previously had a documented history of stalking Ivanka Trump. After becoming fixated and obsessed with Claire, Massler began harassing her which eventually culminated to death threats, various forms of sexual assault and physical violence. After attempting to seek help with little results from the Los Angeles Police Department, Claire taught herself how to track his IP and began studying various forms of risk minimization. After securing her first restraining order against Massler, which was promptly violated, Claire went public with her story in an attempt to educate the public about the various issues stalking victims face. After a 2016 appearance on the show Crime Watch Daily, Claire was introduced to Rhonda Saunders who was instrumental in the formation of the first stalking laws in the nation and inspired Claire to propose legislation benefitting victims of her own.

Claire then made multiple attempts to contact Ivanka Trump for help capturing their mutual stalker which were all ignored. After being named the Erin Brockovich of stalking by Vice in an article which has since gone viral, victims began contacting Claire and seeking help in obtaining their own restraining orders and requesting Claire to accompany them as a human shield in court. Claire and friend, NCIS actress Pauley Perrette as well as two other victims, Katherine Thackston and Peggy Farell, were the subject of a 2-hour 48 hours special titled "Stalked", featuring her story. Kris Mohandie reviewed footage of Massler in the special and determined that he was in fact a dangerous individual. Massler was then admitted to a psychiatric facility where just days later he escaped and was arrested by the Secret Service. Shortly after his release, he returned to Los Angeles to further stalk Claire. After Massler notified her about his intention to kidnap her, Claire set up an operation and had security catch him at the Los Angeles Comic Convention. Massler was convicted of felony max stalking in 2018 and was later released from jail early 2020. Claire has been an outspoken advocate for stalking victims, and on her second appearance on the Dr. Oz Show, shortly before Massler's release, explained it was a result of controversial Proposition 57 which gave Massler early release having only served two years of his four-year sentence. Claire has spoken at USC, Southwestern Law School, and with the Anti-Defamation League for University of California, Irvine School of Law about the intersection of cyberstalking, internet hate speech and freedom of speech.

Personal life
Claire is married to prominent entertainment attorney and DJ Henry Self.

Filmography

Exhibitions
Claire curated many shows including Golden Girls Gone Wild! which debuted 2007 at the World of Wonder Gallery and later had exhibitions at the World Erotic Art Museum in Miami, Florida, and the Dirty Show in Detroit, Michigan. Claire also curated Bettie Page Heaven-Bound directly with Bettie Page's estate featuring the art of legendary pinup artist Olivia De Berardinis.

References

External links
 

American casting directors
Women casting directors
American women curators
American curators
1980 births
Living people
21st-century American women